Jenny Llada (born 22 February 1953) is a Spanish vedette, film and television actress.

Selected filmography
 Inquisition (1978)
 The Man Who Knew Love (1978)
 The Worker (1983)

References

Bibliography
 Jesús García Orts. Lina Morgan: de Angelines a Excelentísima Señora. Editorial Club Universitario, 2015. 
 Àngel Comas. Joan Bosch: el cine i la vida. Cossetània Edicions, 2006.

External links

People from Barcelona
1953 births
Living people
Spanish film actresses
Spanish television actresses